Naoko Hashimoto (橋本直子 Hashimoto Naoko, born July 11, 1984) is a Japanese volleyball player who plays for Il Bisonte Firenze.

Career
Hashimoto debuted with the senior national team in 2013.

Clubs
  Hisamitsu Springs (2003-2009) 
  Ängelholms (2009–2011)
  JT Marvelous (2011–12)
  Voléro Zürich (2012–13)
  JT Marvelous (2013–14)
  CSM Volei Alba Blaj (2014)
  Bangkok Glass (2015)
  Hitachi Rivale (2015–2016)
  Perlas Spikers (2016–2017)
  CSM București (2017–present)

Honours

Team
 2005-06 V.Premier League -  Runner-Up, with Hisamitsu Springs.
 2006 Kurowashiki All Japan Volleyball Tournament -  Champion, with Hisamitsu Springs. 
 2006-07 V.Premier League -  Champion, with Hisamitsu Springs. 
 2007 Kurowashiki All Japan Volleyball Tournament -  Champion, with Hisamitsu Springs. 
 2007 Empress' Cup -  Runner-Up, with Hisamitsu Springs.
 2012 Kurowashiki All Japan Volleyball Tournament -  Champion, with JT Marvelous.

Individual
2007 2006-07 V.Premier League: Best 6
2012 Kurowashiki All Japan Volleyball Tournament Best 6

National Team 
 2013 Asian Championship -  Silver medal

References

External links
FIVB Biography

1984 births
Living people
Sportspeople from Okayama
Expatriate volleyball players in Romania
Japanese expatriate sportspeople in Romania
Japanese women's volleyball players